Jorge Ortiz may refer to:
Jorge Ortíz (athlete) (born 1954), Puerto Rican Olympic sprinter
Jorge Ortiz (Argentine footballer) (born 1984), Argentine midfielder
Jorge Ortiz (Bolivian footballer) (born 1984), Bolivian defender

Jorge Ortiz (Spanish footballer) (born 1992), Spanish midfielder
Jorge Ortiz (fighter) (born c. 1976), Mexican mixed martial artist
Jorge Ortiz de Pinedo (born 1948), Mexican comedian, actor, film director, screenwriter, television producer and host